Quincannon may refer to:

Odin Quincannon, character in the comic book series Preacher
Conan Quincannon, character in the comic book series Preacher
Judge Francis J. Quinncannon, character in the 1945 film And Then There Were None
Sgt. Quinncannon, character in She Wore a Yellow Ribbon and Rio Grande, two westerns directed by John Ford which belong to the cavalry trilogy